is a Japanese manga artist from Nerima, Tokyo.

Harumoto made his debut with a regular serialisation in Weekly Manga Action, in 1987, his first breakthrough manga called Kirin, about street racing centered on a motorcycles was serialised in the motorcycle magazine, Mr Bike BG.

The majority of his work tend to be about motorcycles with the exception of SS which is centralised about cars

His manga SS has since been adapted into a movie to be released in early 2008.

Known Works

Manga/book

Character design
The Screamer (Magical Zoo, 1985)

References

External links
SS movie official site
Official site

Living people
People from Nerima
Manga artists from Tokyo
Year of birth missing (living people)